Webster Muzaza (born 21 August 1997) is a Zambian footballer who plays as a midfielder for Forest Rangers F.C. and the Zambia national football team.

Career

International
Muzaza was included in the Zambia squad for the 2019 COSAFA Cup. He made his senior international debut at that tournament, playing the entirety of Zambia's quarter-final penalty victory over Malawi. Muzaza appeared as a substitute in the next match, against Zimbabwe, but played no part in the final.

Career statistics

International

Honors

International
Zambia
COSAFA Cup Champion: 2019

References

External links

1997 births
Living people
Zambia Super League players
Zambian footballers
Zambia international footballers
Association football midfielders
Forest Rangers F.C. players